Ponteareas is town and municipality in the province of Pontevedra, in Spain.

It is located on the Vigo-Benavente highway and on the river Tea, a right-hand tributary of the Miño. It is the chief town of a fertile hilly region, which produces wine, grain and fruit, and contains many cattle farms. The industries of the town itself are porcelain manufactures, tanning and distilling. Close by are the ruins of the Sobroso Castle, which played an important part in the medieval civil wars. While it is located in the nearby town, Mondariz, it is owned by the council of Ponteareas.

Geography

Parishes
The municipality of Ponteareas is formed by 24 parroquias (parishes) - rural suburbs of the main town. These parishes can be further subdivided into aldeas (villages) or lugares :

 Areas (Santa María): Agualevada, Alemparte, A Cruz, Ganade, A Gándara, A Lomba, O Peso, O Picoto, San Brais
 Arnoso (San Lourenzo): O Cotarel, O Covelo, A Muxena, A Oliveira, O Outeiriño, O Souto da Presa
 Bugarín (Santa Cristina): Camondes, A Chan, As Eiras, A Freixa, A Gándara, A Porteliña, Queidores, A Quintenla, A Rasela, O Viñal
 Celeiros (San Fins): A Carreira, O Outeiro, O Requeixo, Ribadas, Soutelo
 Cristiñade (San Salvador): O Cribeiro, O Feixoal, A Igrexa, Mesego, O Outeiro, O Paseo, Penela, A Porteliña, Porto, A Pousa, O Puño, Rabadeira, As Raíces, Sequeiros, Soutovidal, A Torre, Urcela, A Xesteira
 Cumiar (Santo Estevo): O Areal de Fontes, O Calvario, Candeira, Carballas, A Coutada, O Cruceiro, As Eiras, A Mo, Santa Cruz
 Fontenla (San Mamede): A Ascensión, Barbáns,  O Ceo, Cornedo, A Gaiosa, A Gloria, Novexil, O Picouto, As Rabadeiras
 Fozara (San Bartolomeu): Borraxeiros, A Lomba, Outeiro de Castro, Outeiro Fernando
 Guillade (San Miguel): Aval, Carballede, A Cavadiña, O Eirado, A Encostada, A Igrexa, A Lomba, Mourigade, Pazos, A Pontexil, A Portela, A Rañó, Reimonde, Santa Locaia, A Vigair
 Guláns (San Xulián) : A Abelleira, A Abesoureira, O Aciviñeiro, O Arrabal, O Barreiro, A Barxa, O Casal, A Cima, A Costa da Groba, Costa de Sequeiros, Couso, A Cruz, A Devesa, O Eido Vello, O Lameiro, O Outeiro do Foxo - O Outeiro, O Padrán, Penadouro, O Pereiro, Porto, O Provizo, O Salgueiral, Santa Baia, O Souto, Suaviña, Valiñas
 Moreira (San Martiño): A Amarela, O Calvario, A Cañota, Chan de Espiño, As Covas, A Feira, Macadín, Os Muíños, A Peroxa, O Pontillón, Rañe de Abaixo, Rañe de Arriba, Requeixo, A Ribeira do Río, Sixas, O Soutiño, Urcela, Vilanova
 Nogueira (San Salvador): O Areu, O Castelo, A Costoura, Cruceiras, A Gándara, As Meáns, Monte de Abaixo, A Murxeira, A Nogueira, O Paramo, Pazos, O Rego Alto, O Souto, Torre do Sino
 Santiago de Oliveira (Santiago): A Áspera, A Bouza da Igrexa, O Casal, A Duca, Entrecotos, A Fraga do Rei, A Pedreira, A Portela, A Porteliña, Rabuñade, A Sobreira, Valverde
 San Mateo de Olivera (Santiago): O Agrelo, O Alcázar, O Asperón, O Calandro, A Capela, O Carrascal, A Chan, A Cheira, O Cruceiro, A Cuña, As Godallas, A Manga, O Outeiro, A Pedreira, Penavella, O Piñeiro, Puzo, As Rozas, A Silva, O Val do Eido, Vera, Vilafría
 San Lorenzo de Oliveira (Santiago): As Cabazas, A Camba, As Eiras, Paredes, A Pedreira, Pombeiras, Souto
 Padróns (San Salvador) : Castro, Chan da Gándara, As Cortellas, Maínza, Mouro, A Portela, A Seca, A Serra
 Paredes (San Cibrán): O Picouto, O Ramallal, O Toucedo
 Pías (Santa Mariña): Chans, A Costeliña, Cotobade, A Cruz, A Ermida, A Lenguda, O Outeiro, A Pontacóns, O Souto do Pazo, O Toxo
 Ponteareas (town) (San Miguel): O Areal, O Barral, As Cachadas, Canedo, A Castiñeira, A Curuxeira, Lamazáns, A Moscadeira, O Paseo Matutino, Pedra de Agua, A Perillana, A Ponte dos Remedios, Ponteareas, O Reiro, San Roque, San Vicente, Valoura
 Prado (San Nicolao): O Amial, O Carrascás, A Carrasqueira, O Charco, A Coutada, Os Ferreiros, O Outeiro, A Pardantela, O Pazo, O Souto de Abaixo, O Souto de Arriba
 Ribadetea (San Xurxo): O Aceido, Antela, A Bagañeira, O Barbeito, A Barca, A Barronca, A Barxela, Bernardos, O Cabaleiro, O Canal, Carreira, A Carriza, Os Casás, Os Casquizos, Cillarga, Covas, O Eido do Monte, O Eido Vello, Entreeidos, O Espadanal, O Figueiredo, A Freixa, A Groba, O Igrexario, Lomba do Cruceiro, Mourade, O Outeiro, O Pazo, A Pedra da Bouza, Peitieiras, As Penas, Pereira, O Portal de Dentro, O Porto, A Pousa, Preito, A Rabadeira, O Roupeiro, O Salgueiral, Santa Cruz, O Sobreiro, O Souto, A Tramila, A Videira, Vilares, A Viña Vella
 Xinzo (Santa Mariña): As Balsadas, O Barbeito, A Barreira, Barroselo, Barxelas, A Bergoa, O Borraxeiro, Bouzalonga, Cabreira, A Canella, A Cividá, O Confurco, O Coto, O Eido de Arriba, A Ermida, A Fichoca, Fixón, As Fonteíñas, A Granxa, A Illán, Lamas, O Longaíño, O Moledo, Nando, Parada, O Pereiro, O Picoto, A Portela, O Regote, A Riba, A Rocha, A Rúa, O Sobral, O Souto, A Touza da Vella, Os Valados, A Verdella, A Viña de Lama, A Viña Nova, O Vis

Government
The municipality of Ponteareas is administered by a mayor-council government, the Concello de Ponteareas, which meets at the Casa Consistorial in the Xardins da Xiralda. Following the local elections of 2019 the municipality is governed by a two-party coalition of the Galician Nationalist Bloc and Socialists' Party of Galicia with Xosé Represas as Mayor.

Culture

Festivities
Corpus Christi

The religious festival of Corpus Christi is particularly important. Dating back to 1857, it is traditionally celebrated with a procession of the Holy Sacrament along floral carpets laid in the streets. In 1968 the festival was declared a festival of Tourist Interest, in 1980 of National Tourist Interest, and in 2009 of International Tourist Interest, joining other famous Spanish celebrations such as Fallas and the Tomatina.

Local holidays
 Día da Picaraña (1 May)
 Virgin of os Remedios on (6 September)
 Saint Michael the Archangel (29 September)

Music
The town has a conservatory which is named after Reveriano Soutullo, a composer of Zarzuelas.

International relations
Ponteareas is twinned with:
  Redondela, Galicia (since 1972)
  La Orotava, Canary Islands (since 1984)
  Monòver, Valencian Country
 Galway, Ireland (since 2015)

Notable people
 Gabino Bugallal, politician (1861–1932)
 Reveriano Soutullo, composer (1884–1932)
 Manuel Domínguez Benavides, writer (1895–1947)
 Fermín Bouza Brey, writer (1901–1973)
 Delio Rodríguez, cyclist (1916–1994)
 Emilio Rodríguez, cyclist (1923–1984)
 Rogelio Groba, composer (1930)
 Silverio Rivas, sculptor (1942)
 Abel Caballero, politician (1946)
 Álvaro Pino, cyclist (1956)
 Juan Carlos Taboas, cyclist (1972)
 Gonzalo Caballero Míguez, politician (1975)

References

External links

Official
Concello de Ponteareas 
Official Twitter account of the government of Ponteareas

Municipalities in the Province of Pontevedra